Nikrai was a Georgian calligrapher of the 12-13th century. He rewrote The Ladder of Divine Ascent of John Climacus which was translated in the 11th century by Euthymius of Athos from Greek into Georgian. He wrote in Georgian Nuskhuri script, brown ink with sharp edges by using two columns.

References

Calligraphers from Georgia (country)
12th-century people from Georgia (country)
13th-century people from Georgia (country)